Peter "Apu" Fregene, also known as The Flying Cat (born 17 May 1947) is a former Nigerian football goalkeeper.

Career
Born in Sapele, Fregene played club football for Lagos rivals ECN and Stationery Stores F.C. during a career that spanned the 1960s, 1970s and 1980s. He won the Nigerian FA Cup with both ECN and Stationery Stores.

International career
Fregene was the first choice goalkeeper for the Nigeria national football team from 1968 to 1971, before being recalled for the 1982 African Cup of Nations finals. He also represented Nigeria at the 1968 Summer Olympics in Mexico City.

References

External links

Biography at Sports-reference.com

1947 births
Living people
Sportspeople from Delta State
Nigerian footballers
Olympic footballers of Nigeria
Footballers at the 1968 Summer Olympics
1982 African Cup of Nations players
Nigeria international footballers
Association football goalkeepers
NEPA Lagos players
Stationery Stores F.C. players